The Carrera is a two-seat ultralight aircraft marketed for home building.  Designed by Advanced Aeromarine, it has also been marketed by Advanced Aviation and Arnet Pereyra Inc.  It is a high-wing taildragger aircraft of pusher configuration with side-by-side seating. It is of fabric-covered tubular construction.

The aircraft was later marketed by Keuthan Aircraft as the Sabre and developed into the two-place Sabre II.

Specifications (Carrera 180)

See also

References

 

Homebuilt aircraft
1990s United States ultralight aircraft
Single-engined pusher aircraft
Carrera
Advanced Aviation aircraft